Norway competed in the 2017 Summer Deaflympics which was held in Samsun, Turkey. Norway sent a delegation consisting of 7 participants for the event. This was the 20th consecutive time that Norway participated at the Summer Deaflympics since making its Deaflympic debut in 1931.

Norwegian athletes claimed 2 medals in the event including a gold medal and a bronze medal. Trude Raad won the women's hammer throw event and broke her own world record in the women's hammer throw after claiming gold medal with a record time of 66.05

Medalists

Medal table

References

External links 
Norway at the Deaflympics

2017 in Norwegian sport
Nations at the 2017 Summer Deaflympics
Norway at the Deaflympics